Pamela J. Cluff (born 1931) is an English-born Canadian architect specializing in accessibility design.

Life
Architect Pamela Jean Cluff was born in London and emigrated to Toronto in 1955. 
Partners together with her husband, Pamela formed  A.W. Cluff & P.J. Cluff Architects in 1957 and later her own company titled: Associated Planning Consultants. Her design projects have included clinics, hospitals, homes for the aged, special care units, nursing homes and group homes. She has contributed to various architectural, medical and research journals.

Cluff has been a consultant to Canada Mortgage and Housing Corporation and the Ontario Housing Corporation, has worked on the Toronto Mayor's Task Force on accessibility issues and has served on committees for the National Building Code of Canada and the Ontario Building Code on Barrier Free Design.

Awards
She has received the following awards:
 Design of Excellence (1969)
 City of Toronto Civic Award (1978)
 Canadian Fire Safety Association Special Award (1982)
 Metropolitan Toronto District Health Council Special Award (1983)
 Premiers Award (1985)
 Ontario Association of Architects Order of DaVinci Award (1993)

She is a fellow of the Royal Architectural Institute of Canada.

Family
Cluff gave birth to five children, four of which are living. Married to Alfred William Cluff in the early 1950s, and then, in 1997, to Frank Gilbert Final. Both of her husbands are now deceased.

References 

1931 births
Living people
Canadian women architects